In mathematics, the lattice of subgroups of a group  is the lattice whose elements are the subgroups of , with the partial order relation being set inclusion.
In this lattice, the join of two subgroups is the subgroup generated by their union, and the meet of two subgroups is their intersection.

Example 

The dihedral group Dih4 has ten subgroups, counting itself and the trivial subgroup. Five of the eight group elements generate subgroups of order two, and the other two non-identity elements both generate the same cyclic subgroup of order four. In addition, there are two subgroups of the form Z2 × Z2, generated by pairs of order-two elements. The lattice formed by these ten subgroups is shown in the illustration.

This example also shows that the lattice of all subgroups of a group is not a modular lattice in general. Indeed, this particular lattice contains the forbidden "pentagon" N5 as a sublattice.

Properties 
For any A, B, and C subgroups of a group with A ≤ C (A subgroup of C) then AB ∩ C = A(B ∩ C); the multiplication here is the product of subgroups. This property has been called the modular property of groups  or (Dedekind's) modular law. Since for two normal subgroups the product is actually the smallest subgroup containing the two, the normal subgroups form a modular lattice.

The Lattice theorem establishes a Galois connection between the lattice of subgroups of a group and that of its quotients.

The Zassenhaus lemma gives an isomorphism between certain combinations of quotients and products in the lattice of subgroups.

In general, there is no restriction on the shape of the lattice of subgroups, in the sense that every lattice is isomorphic to a sublattice of the subgroup lattice of some group. Furthermore, every finite lattice is isomorphic to a sublattice of the subgroup lattice of some finite group .

Characteristic lattices 
Subgroups with certain properties form lattices, but other properties do not.

 Normal subgroups always form a modular lattice. In fact, the essential property that guarantees that the lattice is modular is that subgroups commute with each other, i.e. that they are quasinormal subgroups.
 Nilpotent normal subgroups form a lattice, which is (part of) the content of Fitting's theorem.
 In general, for any Fitting class F, both the subnormal F-subgroups  and the normal F-subgroups form lattices.  This includes the above with F the class of nilpotent groups, as well as other examples such as F the class of solvable groups.  A class of groups is called a Fitting class if it is closed under isomorphism, subnormal subgroups, and products of subnormal subgroups.
 Central subgroups form a lattice.

However, neither finite subgroups nor torsion subgroups form a lattice: for instance, the free product  is generated by two torsion elements, but is infinite and contains elements of infinite order.

The fact that normal subgroups form a modular lattice is a particular case of a more general result, namely that in any Maltsev variety (of which groups are an example), the lattice of congruences is modular .

Characterizing groups by their subgroup lattices 
For instance, as Ore proved, a group is locally cyclic if and only if its lattice of subgroups is distributive. If additionally the lattice satisfies the ascending chain condition, then the group is cyclic.

The groups whose lattice of subgroups is a complemented lattice are called complemented groups , and the groups whose lattice of subgroups are modular lattices are called Iwasawa groups or modular groups . Lattice-theoretic characterizations of this type also exist for solvable groups and perfect groups .

References 

 Review by Ralph Freese in Bull. AMS 33 (4): 487–492.

External links
 PlanetMath entry on lattice of subgroups
 Example: Lattice of subgroups of the symmetric group S4

Lattice theory
Group theory